Platypolia is a genus of moths of the family Noctuidae.

Species
 Platypolia anceps (Stephens, 1850)
 Platypolia contadina (Smith, 1894)
 Platypolia loda (Strecker, 1898)
 Platypolia mactata (Guenée, 1852)

References
Natural History Museum Lepidoptera genus database
Platypolia at funet

Cuculliinae